A special election for Louisiana's 5th congressional district was held on November 16, 2013, to elect a member of the United States House of Representatives. Incumbent Republican Congressman Rodney Alexander resigned on September 26, 2013, to become the Secretary of the Louisiana Department of Veterans Affairs under Governor Bobby Jindal.

The primary election was held on October 19, 2013. Under Louisiana's jungle primary system, all candidates appear on the same ballot, regardless of party. As no candidate received 50 percent plus one vote during the primary election, the general election was held on November 16 between the top two candidates in the primary, Republicans Neil Riser, a state senator from Columbia in Caldwell Parish, and Vance McAllister, a businessman from Swartz. In the general election, McAllister handily defeated Riser to win the seat.

Background
On August 6, 2013, Alexander announced that he would not seek a seventh term in the House in the 2014 congressional elections. He cited his weariness with partisanship in Washington, D.C., as the primary reason for his decision to retire. On August 7, Alexander moved up his timetable for departure from Congress. He resigned his seat effective September 26. Alexander joined the administration of Governor Bobby Jindal as the new secretary of the Louisiana Department of Veterans Affairs.

Controversy
The day after Alexander announced his resignation, Republican state senator Neil Riser publicly declared his candidacy and launched his website. Within days, he had hired a campaign manager and started distributing campaign material. Riser's unusually fast response to the unexpected announcement of the special election led to charges of favoritism by Alexander and Governor Jindal. Specifically, that they colluded to declare Alexander's appointment to the State Cabinet in a surprise announcement and ensure a short filing period so as to benefit Riser, who, it was alleged, knew of Alexander's plans in advance.

Riser had filed documents with the Federal Election Commission to run in the special election the day before Alexander announced his resignation, although he claimed that this was a "clerical error" on the part of the FEC. Additionally, Riser had traveled through the district for several months with Alexander before the announcement and had been endorsed by every Republican congressman from Louisiana within days. An editorial by The Town Talk said: "If this feels a lot like someone has stolen your vote, well, let’s just say you’re not alone."

Republican state representative Jay Morris declared his candidacy and accused Alexander and Jindal of trying to "rig the election", adding that "it appears to me some sort of deal was made to grant an advantage to [Riser]. It disturbs me and should disturb everyone that an election could be manipulated like this." Democratic state senator Rick Gallot had considered joining the race but declined, citing the short time frame and unexpected nature of the announcement. When declaring his candidacy, Democrat Jamie Mayo, the mayor of Monroe, said that he assumed the allegations were true, "but I'm not doing to cry over spilled milk." Republican Public Service Commissioner and former Congressman Clyde C. Holloway said that his candidacy for the seat was motivated by suspicions that Alexander and Jindal wanted Riser to win, saying: "This thing stinks... I feel like we tried to have an appointed congressman by the governor and by Rodney... Without any doubt, I think they've been orchestrating this for months." The state's junior U.S. Senator, Republican David Vitter, declined to make an endorsement and said that "it's a very quick election. And it's obvious that didn't happen by accident." Attorney Ed Tarpley, who had considered running, said that "Everywhere I go without exception people are angry about what happened. [The short time frame means voters are] deprived of the normal election cycle."

The Jindal administration has responded that the election was not rigged, with press secretary Sean Lansing saying: "There is no truth to [the] claims." Timmy Teepell, who previously worked as a political consultant for Riser and as Jindal's Chief of Staff said: "It's a free country, and nobody is prevented from running. Is two weeks not enough time... to get to Baton Rouge to qualify to run next week?" Alexander said, "There was no deal", and Riser added, "I don’t think it was any secret that I wanted to eventually run for the seat. I've been clear the past two years about my intention to run." After Riser announced that he would run for Congress, Teepell and his Virginia-based On Message, Inc., assumed management of the campaign.

Candidates

Republican Party

Declared
 Clyde C. Holloway, Public Service Commissioner and former U.S. Representative from Rapides Parish
 Vance McAllister, businessman
 Jay Morris, state representative
 Neil Riser, state senator
 Phillip "Blake" Weatherly, engineer

Declined
 Elbert Guillory, state senator
 Jeff Guerriero, attorney
 Jonathan Johnson, Alexander's State Director
 Willie Robertson, star of Duck Dynasty and CEO of Duck Commander
 Ed Tarpley, Alexandria attorney; Grant Parish district attorney from 1991 to 1997
 Adam Terry, Alexander's Chief of Staff
 Mike Walsworth, state senator
 Bob Webber, Ouachita Parish School Superintendent

Endorsements

Democratic Party

Declared
 Marcus Hunter, state representative
 Robert Johnson, state representative
 Jamie Mayo, Mayor of Monroe
 Weldon Russell, former state representative

Declined
 Rick Gallot, state senator
 Katrina Jackson, state representative
 Charles Kincade, attorney
 Jacques Roy, Mayor of Alexandria

Libertarian Party

Declared
 Henry Herford, Jr., farmer and former chairman of the Louisiana Republican State Convention
 Samir B. A. Zaitoon, life insurance agent

Others

Declared
 Eliot Barron (Green), realtor
 Tom Gibbs (Independent), oil and gas land owner
 Peter Williams (Independent), tree farmer

Jungle primary

Polling
Other polls that were not made public showed that Riser was a "lock" to make the runoff with Holloway "consistently" polling in second place. Morris, McAllister and Mayo also had the potential to make the runoff, with McAllister seen as the most likely to benefit from a slip in support for Holloway.

Results

General election

Candidates
 Vance McAllister, businessman (Republican)
 Neil Riser, funeral home owner and state senator (Republican)

Campaign
Riser was the heavy favorite to win and McAllister was thought to have little chance of pulling off an upset. Riser raised and spent more money than McAllister, who largely self-financed his campaign. While Riser was backed by both the Republican establishment and the Tea Party, McAllister boasted endorsements from the stars of the television show Duck Dynasty. During the campaign, McAllister ran to Riser's left, particularly on the Patient Protection and Affordable Care Act. Riser spoke only of repealing the law whereas McAllister argued that with a Democratic majority in the Senate, repeal had no chance of success and that the two parties should work together to improve the law. He also emphasised his support for two of its key components: the Medicaid expansion and preventing insurance companies from denying coverage to people with pre-existing conditions. Riser campaigned on his experience and his opposition to President Obama. McAllister campaigned as a pragmatic outsider and won over voters who were frustrated with Congress and politicians in general.

Results

References

External links
Louisiana's 5th congressional district special election, 2013 at Ballotpedia
Campaign contributions at OpenSecrets

Louisiana 2013 05
Louisiana 05
2013 05 special
Louisiana 2013 05
2013 Louisiana elections
United States House of Representatives 2013 05